The General English Proficiency Test (GEPT; , or  for short) is a test of English language proficiency that was commissioned by Taiwan's Ministry of Education in 1999.  The GEPT was developed by the Language Training and Testing Center  in Taipei, Taiwan and was first administered in 2002.

Overview 
There are four levels of the test currently being administered: elementary, intermediate, high-intermediate, and advanced. A fifth level, the superior level, was administered only once and then suspended, pending further need. With the exception of the advanced level of the test, which is only conducted in Taipei at the LTTC headquarters, the GEPT is administered at sites located around the island of Taiwan as well as on offshore islands including Penghu and Kinmen.

The GEPT Elementary level is presumed to be appropriate for students who have studied English through junior high school. The GEPT Intermediate level is seen as suitable for high school graduates or university freshmen. The GEPT High-intermediate level is thought to be suitable for university graduates majoring in English. The GEPT Advanced level test is considered adequately difficult that only someone with a graduate degree from a university in an English-speaking country would be able to pass it.

Reportedly, comparability studies that will relate  the GEPT to the Common European Framework standards of language proficiency are underway.

Each level is administered in a two-stage process. First, all examinees at each level take a listening and reading comprehension test. Those examinees who pass this first stage are allowed to register for the second stage, the speaking and writing portions of the test.

Total number of examinees and passing rates 
The elementary level test was first administered in 2002 and has been held twice each year since then. The total number of examinees to take the first stage of the elementary test through early 2005 was over 500,000. The passing rate for the first stage of the test is currently approximately 40%. The passing rate for examinees taking the second stage is approximately 77%.

The intermediate level of the test has also been held twice yearly since 2002. The number of examinees taking stage one of the test totals over 300,000, with a  passing rate of approximately 34% for the first stage and 33% for the second stage.

The high-intermediate level of the test, also held twice yearly, has had a total of approximately 60,000 through 2004, and passing rates of 32% and 30% respectively for stages one and two.

The advanced level of the test is held once yearly, and the total number of examinees who have taken it since 2002 is approximately 3,000. The passing rate for stage one is approximately 21% and 16% for stage two.

See also
 Public English Test System - English test in Mainland China

References

Further reading
 Wu, Mei (吴 梅; Leshan Normal University). "Comparing PETS and GEPT in China and Taiwan" (Archive). English Language Teaching (ISSN 1916-4742 (Print); ISSN  1916-4750 (Online)). Canadian Center of Science and Education, Vol. 5, No. 6; June 2012. Received 24 February 2012. Published 1 June 2012. DOI: 10.5539/elt.v5n6p48 - See profile page - Alternate location at ERIC

External links
LTTC's GEPT website

English language tests
Language education in Taiwan